Scrobipalpa hungariae is a moth in the family Gelechiidae. It was described by Otto Staudinger in 1871. It lives in Austria, Croatia, Hungary and Ukraine.

The ground colour of the forewings is uniform greyish-black.

References

Scrobipalpa
Moths described in 1871